A by-election was held for the New South Wales Legislative Assembly electorate of Glebe on 10 September 1898 because James Hogue had been appointed Public Instruction and Minister for Labour and Industry in the Reid ministry. Until 1904, members appointed to a ministerial position were required to face a by-election. These were generally uncontested. Of the three ministers appointed with the second arrangement of the Reid ministry, Glebe was the only electorate in which the by-election was contested.

Dates

Result

James Hogue was appointed Minister for Public Instruction and Labour and Industry in the Reid ministry.

See also
Electoral results for the district of Glebe

References

1898 elections in Australia
New South Wales state by-elections
1890s in New South Wales